Philip Greeley Clapp (August 4, 1888 – April 9, 1954) was an American educator, conductor, pianist, and composer of classical music.

He served as Director of the School of Music at the University of Iowa for more than three decades (1919–1953), helping to establish that school's strong reputation in music and in the arts overall. He worked especially hard in advocating that music and the other arts should be an integral part of a liberal arts education, and succeeded in creating strong graduate programs that awarded degrees not just in scholarship and research but also in performance and creation. Among his students was Gene Gutchë.

As a composer, Clapp followed firmly in the line of Romantic and Impressionist works created by Wagner, Mahler, Strauss and Debussy , as well as perhaps Liszt, and others, but adding his own distinctly American style and ideas about orchestration. Although a number of his compositions were never performed, several of his twelve symphonies were premiered by major orchestras and conductors, including Dimitri Mitropoulos and the New York Philharmonic, who gave the first public performance of the Eighth Symphony in Carnegie Hall on February 7, 1952 . Karl Muck arranged for him to conduct the world premieres of his First and Third Symphonies with the Boston Symphony Orchestra .

Writings
1916. "Sebastian Bach, Modernist". The Musical Quarterly 2, no. 2 (April): 295–313.

References

External links
Holcomb, Dorothy R. 1972. "Philip Greeley Clapp". Books at Iowa 17 (November): 3-14.

1888 births
1954 deaths
American male composers
American composers
University of Iowa faculty
20th-century American male musicians